The Anticapitalist Left (GA), also known as Flow for an Anticapitalist Project (SAP), is a Belgian Trotskyist political party. It is the Belgian section of the Fourth International. In the 2010 election, Front des gauches (CP, LCR, PSL and PH) received 1.15% of votes for the Senat.

The party was long led by Ernest Mandel. It publishes La Gauche and Rood.

Electoral results

Federal Parliament

Chamber of Representatives

Senate

External links
  
  

Communist parties in Belgium
Fourth International (post-reunification)
Trotskyist organizations in Europe